Malmros may refer to:

Nils Malmros
Ted Malmros